Dhaka Bank Limited is a private limited commercial bank in Bangladesh. Its headquarters are situated in Dhaka. Currently the bank has 100 branches and 3 SME Service Centers around the country.

History 
The bank was founded in 1995 by Bangladeshi politician Mirza Abbas. Founder Chairman of the Board of Directors of this Bank is Abdul Hai Sarker.

In July 2009, Altaf Hossain Sarker was re-elected chairman of Dhaka Bank Limited.

Reshadur Rahman Shaheen was elected chairman of Dhaka Bank Limited in April 2010.

Bangladesh Bank refused to approve the reappointment of Mirza Abbas as director of Dhaka Bank in September 2015 after being absent in 11 out of 12 board meetings. Bangladesh Nationalist Party described his removal from the board as political vendetta by the government. On 11 November, Syed Mahbubur Rahman was appointed managing director of Dhaka Bank Limited. Reshadur Rahman was elected chairman of Dhaka Bank Limited.

In March 2017, Dhaka Bank signed an agreement with International Finance Corporation to receive 55 million USD loan.

The Anti-Corruption Commission arrested an official of Dhaka Bank Limited from Feni District for embezzling 78 million BDT from the bank in April 2019. He admitted to embezzling 55 million BDT from the bank.

In August 2020, Abdullah Al Ahsan was appointed vice-chairman of Dhaka Bank Limited. Abdul Hai Sarker was elected chairman of the board. Bangladesh High Court denied bail to a former VP of the bank on accusations of embezzling 220 million BDT from the bank.

Two officials of the bank were detained for misappropriating 37.7 million BDT from Dhaka Bank. Abdul Hai Sarker was re-elected chairman of Dhaka Bank Limited in July 2021.

Dhaka Bank arranged a 5.2 billion BDT syndicated loan for Chandpur Power Generations Limited of Doreen Group. It also 40 million USD for the powerplant from banks in Germany. In April it signed an agreement with Canadian University of Bangladesh. In October 2022, Dhaka Bank received an award from JP Morgan. It raised 9 billion BDT syndicated loan for Bashundhara Oil and Gas Company Limited of Bashundhara Group.

Board of Directors
 Abdul Hai Sarker - Chairman
 Md. Aman Ullah Sarker - Vice Chairman
 Reshadur Rahman
 Tahidul Hossain Chowdhury
 Md. Amirullah
 Rokshana Zaman
 Altaf Hossain Sarker
 Mohammed Hanif
 Khondoker Monir Uddin
 Jashim Uddin
 Rakhi Das Gupta
 Mirza Yasser Abbas
 Manoara Khandaker
 Abdullah Al Ahsan
 Feroz Ahmed (Independent Director)
 M. A. Taslim (Independent Director)
 Ahbab Ahmad (Independent Director)
 Emranul Huq (Managing Director)

Awards
In SME Banking Award 2014, Dhaka Bank was awarded the best manufacturing-friendly bank.

See also

 List of banks in Bangladesh

References

External links
 Official website
 Company Information – DHAKA BANK LIMITED (DHAKABANK) — Chittagong Stock Exchange
 Dhaka Bank Ltd (DKBK:Dhaka) — Bloomberg Businessweek
 Top Ten Asian Banks — toptenbank.com
 Brief profile of the Bank. — Bangladesh Association of Banks
 Bangladesh money laundering inquiry — BBC

Banks established in 1995
Banks of Bangladesh
Companies listed on the Dhaka Stock Exchange
Companies based in Dhaka
Banks of Bangladesh with Islamic banking services